Nasirul Haque Sabu is a Bangladesh Nationalist Party politician and the former Member of Parliament of Rajbari-2.

Career
Sabu was elected to parliament from Rajbari-2 as a Bangladesh Nationalist Party candidate in 2001. He is the President of Rajbari District unit of Bangladesh Nationalist Party.

References

Bangladesh Nationalist Party politicians
Living people
8th Jatiya Sangsad members
Year of birth missing (living people)